Farm to Market Road 1053 (FM 1053) is a Farm to Market Road in the U.S. state of Texas maintained by the Texas Department of Transportation (TxDOT). The road, located in Pecos, Crane, and Ector counties, begins along the concurrent routes of Business Interstate 10-G (Bus. I-10-G), U.S. Route 285 (US 285), and U.S. Route 385 (US 385) in the city of Fort Stockton and continues to the north ending at Interstate 20 (I-20) near Penwell. The road passes through the towns of Imperial, where it intersects  FM 11, and Tubbs Corner, where it crosses State Highway 329 (SH 329). The road also has major intersections with  I-10 / US 67 in Fort Stockton as well as  FM 1450 and  FM 1233.

Route description
The  two-lane road begins in Pecos County at the combined routes of Bus. I-10-G, US 285, and US 385 along Dickinson Boulevard in Fort Stockton. The route proceeds along North Main Street through the north side of Fort Stockton and turns to the northeast before intersecting the I-10 / US 67 bypass along the edge of town. FM 1450 branches off to the northwest toward Pecos as FM 1053 continues to the northeast. The road intersects FM 11 in Imperial before crossing the Pecos River into Crane County.

History
FM 1053 was designated along its current alignment on June 1, 1948. The road formerly terminated at  US 290 along the current Bus. I-10-G at its south end and  US 80 at its north end, which were in western Texas the progenitor routes of I-10 and I-20 respectively.

Major intersections

See also

References

External links

1053
Transportation in Crane County, Texas
Transportation in Ector County, Texas
Transportation in Pecos County, Texas